Neocosmospora vasinfecta is a fungal plant pathogen.

Varieties
Neocosmospora vasinfecta f. africana
Neocosmospora vasinfecta f. vasinfecta
Neocosmospora vasinfecta var. africana
Neocosmospora vasinfecta var. major
Neocosmospora vasinfecta var. pisi
Neocosmospora vasinfecta var. tracheiphila
Neocosmospora vasinfecta var. vasinfecta

See also
 List of soybean diseases

References

External links

Fungal plant pathogens and diseases
Nectriaceae
Fungi described in 1899
Soybean diseases